Ryan Soderquist (born December 30, 1976) is an American ice hockey coach. He has coached at Bentley University since 2001 and is the program's longest tenured head coach.

Career
Soderquist arrived at Bentley in the fall of 1996 and got off to a fast start, leading the team in scoring as a freshman. His sophomore season was even more impressive as he set team records for both goals (33) and points (59) in one season that still stand (as of 2014). in 1998–99 Bentley began to make a move to become a Division I program, playing a stronger collection of opponents over the course of the season, and it was reflected in Soderquist's decrease in scoring, posting less than half of the previous year's totals, but when the Falcons became an official member of the MAAC the following year he rebounded, netting 48 points and finishing his career as the all-time leader in goals (84) and points (173).

After graduating in 2000 Soderquist spent a year away from his alma mater before returning as an assistant coach in 2001–02. With the team struggling for wins at the D-I level, Jim McAdam stepped down in favor of Soderquist, allowing the 25-year-old to become one of the youngest head coaches in NCAA history. The team responded by winning 15 games in his first season, more than three times the number they had won the year prior. Over 12 year as head coach Soderquist has slowly been building Bentley into a good team, pushing the team to three .500 seasons and received two Coach of the Year awards for his efforts.

Career statistics

Head coaching record

Source

Awards and honors

References

External links

1976 births
Living people
American ice hockey coaches
Bentley Falcons men's ice hockey players
People from Stoneham, Massachusetts
Ice hockey coaches from Massachusetts
Sportspeople from Middlesex County, Massachusetts
Ice hockey players from Massachusetts
Bentley Falcons men's ice hockey coaches